Cape Palliser Lighthouse is a lighthouse at Cape Palliser in the Wellington region of the North Island of New Zealand. It is owned and operated by Maritime New Zealand.

The light was built in 1897 and was originally fueled by oil. In 1954 the oil lamp was replaced with an electric one powered by a local diesel generator. This was subsequently replaced by a connection to the mains grid in 1967, although a diesel generator is retained for emergency power. The light was fully automated in 1986 and is now managed from a control room in Wellington.

The base of the lighthouse is reached via a staircase with 258 steps, up a 58-metre-high cliff.  This staircase – built in 1912 – replaced a dangerous dirt track.

Cape Palliser lighthouse is one of three New Zealand lighthouses with a distinct striped paint scheme; the other two are Dog Island Lighthouse and Cape Campbell Lighthouse, which both have black and white stripes.

See also 

 List of lighthouses in New Zealand

References

External links 

 Lighthouses of New Zealand Maritime New Zealand
 

Lighthouses completed in 1897
Lighthouses in New Zealand
Buildings and structures in the Wairarapa
1890s architecture in New Zealand